The 27th Guam Legislature was a meeting of the Guam Legislature. It convened in Hagatna, Guam on January 6, 2003 and ended on January 3, 2005, during the 1st and 2nd years of Felix P. Camacho's 1st Gubernatorial Term.

In the 2002 Guamanian general election, the Democratic Party of Guam won a nine-to-six (9-6) majority of seats in the Guam Legislature.

Leadership

Legislative
 Speaker: Vicente C. Pangelinan
 Vice Speaker: Frank B. Aguon Jr.
 Legislative Secretary: Tina Muña Barnes

Majority (Democratic)
 Majority Leader: Lou Leon Guerrero
 Assistant Majority Leader: Antoinette "Toni" Sanford
 Majority Whip: Dr. Carmen Fernandez
 Assistant Majority Whip: John M. "JQ" Quinata

Minority (Republican)
 Minority Leader: Mark Forbes
 Assistant Minority Leader: Joanne M. Salas Brown
 Minority Whip: Lawrence F. Kasperbauer
 Assistant Minority Whip: Jesse Anderson Lujan

Party Summary

Membership
The following is a list of senators in the current Guam Legislature.

References 

Political organizations based in Guam
Politics of Guam
Legislature of Guam